Tricondyla is a genus of tiger beetle, containing the following species:

 Tricondyla annulicornis Schmidt-Goebel, 1846
 Tricondyla aptera (Olivier, 1790)
 Tricondyla beccarii Gestro, 1874
 Tricondyla bengalensis Naviaux, 2002
 Tricondyla brunnea Dokhtouroff, 1883
 Tricondyla cavifrons Schaum, 1862
 Tricondyla conicicollis Chaudoir, 1844
 Tricondyla coriacea Chevrolat, 1841
 Tricondyla cyanea Dejean, 1825
 Tricondyla cyanipes Eschscholtz, 1829
 Tricondyla darwini Naviaux, 2002
 Tricondyla deuvei Naviaux, 2002
 Tricondyla distincta Fleutiaux, 1893
 Tricondyla doriai Gestro, 1874
 Tricondyla elenae Werner, 1992
 Tricondyla elongata W.Horn, 1906
 Tricondyla femorata Walker, 1858
 Tricondyla fulgida Naviaux, 2002
 Tricondyla genieri Naviaux, 2008
 Tricondyla gestroi Fleutiaux, 1893
 Tricondyla gounellei W.Horn, 1900
 Tricondyla gracilis Naviaux, 2002
 Tricondyla granulifera Motschulsky, 1857
 Tricondyla herculeana W.Horn, 1942
 Tricondyla ledouxi Naviaux, 2002
 Tricondyla macrodera Chaudoir, 1860
 Tricondyla magna Werner, 1992
 Tricondyla mellyi Chaudoir, 1850
 Tricondyla mourzinei Naviaux, 2002
 Tricondyla niasensis Naviaux, 2002
 Tricondyla nigripalpis W.Horn, 1894
 Tricondyla oblita Naviaux, 2002
 Tricondyla ovaligrossa W.Horn, 1922
 Tricondyla ovicollis Motschulsky, 1864
 Tricondyla planiceps Schaum, 1862
 Tricondyla proxima Fleutiaux, 1893
 Tricondyla pulchripes White, 1844
 Tricondyla punctulata Chaudoir, 1861
 Tricondyla reducta Naviaux, 2002
 Tricondyla rivalieri Naviaux, 2002
 Tricondyla schuelei Naviaux, 2002
 Tricondyla stricticeps Chaudoir, 1864
 Tricondyla tuberculata Chaudoir, 1860
 Tricondyla ventricosa Schaum, 1862
 Tricondyla wallacei J.Thomson, 1857
 Tricondyla werneri Naviaux, 2002
 Tricondyla wiesneri Naviaux, 2002

References

External links
 
 

 
Cicindelidae